These are the people who, at one time or another, had been considered, announced, declined or withdrew his or her candidacy in the 2013 Philippine Senate election.

Qualified candidates
These are the commission's approved candidates:

Disqualified candidates/Withdrawn
The following individuals have submitted their certificates of candidacies to the Commission on Elections main office at Intramuros, Manila, but were not included in the official list of candidates.

Withdrew candidacy
Ruffy Biazon (Liberal), incumbent Commissioner of the Bureau of Customs and 2010 senatorial candidate. He was among the first four announced candidates of the Liberal Party. In the following weeks since, however, he was not certain of his candidacy. On September 25, he announced that he will not run for the Senate in 2013 and will stay instead at the BOC. His father, former Senator and incumbent Muntinlupa Rep. Rodolfo Biazon is seen as his replacement in the LP ticket.
Joey de Venecia (PDP–Laban), businessman, whistleblower of the Philippine National Broadband Network controversy and 2010 senatorial candidate. He is among the first five bets of the UNA coalition.
Gwendolyn Garcia (PDP–Laban/One Cebu), incumbent Governor of Cebu. She was included in the UNA ticket after she took her oath as member of PDP–Laban on May 25, 2012. On September 20, Vice President Jejomar Binay announced that Garcia will run for the House of Representatives instead.
Win Gatchalian (NPC), incumbent Mayor of Valenzuela. He was on the shortlist of the LP-NP-NPC coalition ticket. He withdrew his Senatorial plans September 25.
Alma Moreno (Lakas-CMD), actress, incumbent Councilor of Parañaque, and national president of the Philippine Councilors League. She announced her candidacy in May 2011, but withdrew on September 5 after it was announced that Moreno is suffering from multiple sclerosis.
Danton Remoto, chairman emeritus of  Ang Ladlad, an LGBT political party. On May 18, he announced his intention to run for the Senate. But, he did not file his certificate of candidacy at COMELEC.
Lorenzo Tañada III (Liberal), incumbent Representative from Quezon and Deputy Speaker of the House of Representatives. He was included in the LP slate shortlist, but volunteered to withdraw from the race, according to Pres. Aquino III.
Joel Villanueva, incumbent Secretary-General of the Technical Education and Skills Development Authority. He was among the first four announced candidates of the Liberal Party. On September 24, he announced that he was advised by Pres. Benigno Aquino III not to run for any elective position, and instead remain in TESDA for the time being.
Israel Virgines (Bangon Pilipinas), stating that his party is giving way "to a more capable leader".

Declined candidacy
The following individuals have been speculated as probable senatorial candidates, but have denied interest publicly.
Florencio Abad, incumbent Secretary of Budget and Management
Oscar V. Cruz, retired Archbishop of Lingayen-Dagupan
Sara Duterte, incumbent Mayor of Davao City
Gary Estrada, actor and incumbent Provincial Board member of Quezon
Lani Mercado, incumbent Representative from Cavite chose to defend her seat in the House of Representatives.
Leni Robredo, widow of former Interior and Local Government Secretary  Jesse Robredo chose to run for Camarines Sur's 2nd district's seat in the House of Representatives
Mar Roxas, incumbent Secretary of Department of the Interior and Local Government, former Senator, and 2010 vice-presidential candidate
Adel Tamano, lawyer, talk show host, and 2010 senatorial candidate
Gilbert Teodoro, former Secretary of National Defense and 2010 presidential candidate

Prospective candidates
The following individuals have been speculated as probable senatorial candidates, but did not run:

Former senators
Rodolfo Biazon, incumbent Representative from Muntinlupa, chose to defend his seat for Representative from Muntlnlupa's district instead

Others
Neric Acosta, former Representative from Bukidnon and 2010 senatorial candidate
Rodolfo Antonino, incumbent Representative from Nueva Ecija
Kris Aquino, television host and actress
Raul Bacalzo, retired Director General and former Chief of the Philippine National Police
Ricky Carandang, incumbent Secretary of the Presidential Communications Development and Strategic Planning Office
Leila de Lima, incumbent Secretary of Justice
Mike Enriquez, GMA-7 news broadcaster
Rodolfo Fariñas, incumbent Representative from Ilocos Norte 
Roilo Golez, incumbent Representative from Parañaque
Edwin Lacierda, incumbent Presidential Spokesman
Danilo Lim, incumbent Deputy Commissioner for Intelligence of the Bureau of Customs, retired brigadier general, and 2010 senatorial candidate
Imee Marcos, incumbent Governor of Ilocos Norte, chose to run for the governorship of Ilocos Norte instead.
Grace Padaca, former Governor of Isabela, was appointed commissioner of the Commission on Elections instead.
Manuel L. Quezon III, incumbent Undersecretary of the Presidential Communications Development and Strategic Planning Office,
Roman Romulo, incumbent Representative from Pasig. chose to defend his seat for Representative from Pasig's district instead.
Joey Salceda, incumbent Governor of Albay
Korina Sanchez, ABS-CBN news broadcaster
Vic Sotto, Celebrity & Host  
Niel Tupas, Jr., incumbent Representative from Iloilo, chose to defend his seat for Representative from Iloilo's 5th district instead.

References

2013 Philippine general election